Glass Wars is the debut studio album by experimental electronic group 1 Mile North, originally released in 2001 and re-released in 2003 by Old Colony Recordings.

Track listing
 "New Clock" - 6:28
 "Have a Good One What" - 5:45
 "Parents Arrive" - 6:15
 "Evil Architecture" - 9:00
 "Insides" - 5:42
 "Escorting Deep Waters" - 11:01
 "Man Rounds Corner" - 3:28

References

2001 debut albums
1 Mile North albums